Sudhin Das (30 April 1930 – 27 June 2017) was a Bangladeshi Nazrul Sangeet musician. He was awarded Ekushey Padak by the Government of Bangladesh.

Early life and career
Das was born in Bagichagaon, Comilla, to Nishi Kanta Das and Hemprabha Das on 30 April 1930. Das started learning music at Sangeet Shikhharthee Sammilan in Comilla, established by his elder brother Suren Das in 1942. Das was enlisted in Radio Pakistan when he was a college student in 1948.

In 1985, after finishing his learning, Das moved to Dhaka and joined as a member of the Nazrul Sangeet Promanikoron Board at Nazrul Institute. He taught Nazrul Sangeet to the young artists of the institute.

Personal life

Das was married to Neelima Das. She is also an artist of Nazrul Sangeet. She also received Nazrul Padak and Channel i Lifetime Achievement award. His niece Alaka Das is an artist of Classical and Nazrul Sangeet.

Awards
 Shaheed Altaf Mahmood Memorial Gold Medal (1985) 
 Ekushey Padak (1988)
 Meril Prothom Alo Awards for Lifetime Achievement (2010)
 Nazrul Padak (1999)
 Churulia Nazrul Academy's Nazrul Award 
 Nasiruddin Gold Medal
 Zebunnessa- Mahbubullah Trust Gold Medal

References

1930 births
2017 deaths
Bangladeshi male musicians
Bangladeshi Nazrul Geeti singers
Bangladeshi Hindus
Recipients of the Ekushey Padak
Honorary Fellows of Bangla Academy
Meril-Prothom Alo Lifetime Achievement Award winners
People from Comilla